Hetzron may refer to

People

 Hezron (or Hetzron), the name of two Biblical figures
 Robert Hetzron, linguist

Places

 Hezron (or Hetzron), a plain in the south of Judah